You Fat Bastard is a 2 CD anthology by British electronic rock artists Carter USM. It was released on 15 October 2007.

Track listing

Disc 1
 "Surfin' USM"
 "24 Minutes From Tulse Hill"
 "After The Watershed (Early Learning The Hard Way)"
 "Rent"
 "Shopper's Paradise"
 "Midnight On The Murder Mile"
 "The Young Offender's Mum"
 "Always The Bridesmaid Never The Bride"
 "Lenny And Terence"
 "Let's Get Tattoos"
 "Johnny Cash"
 "England"
 "Anytime Anyplace Anywhere"
 "R.S.P.C.E."
 "A Prince In A Pauper's Grave"
 "This Is How It Feels"
 "Everything You Ever Wanted To Know About Everything"
 "Falling On A Bruise"

Disc 2
 "Glam Rock Cops"
 "Re-Educating Rita"
 "Born On The 5th Of November"
 "Do Re Me So Far So Good"
 "Rubbish"
 "Lean On Me I Won't Fall Over"
 "Girls Can Keep A Secret"
 "The Only Living Boy In New Cross"
 "Say It With Flowers"
 "Bloodsport For All"
 "The Impossible Dream"
 "The Music That Nobody Likes"
 "And God Created Brixton"
 "Sheriff Fatman"
 "The Only Loony Left In Town"
 "A Perfect Day To Drop The Bomb"
 "G I Blues" (contains hidden track "As You Are Leaving The Building")

Carter the Unstoppable Sex Machine albums
2007 compilation albums